Pearl Kiyawn Nageak Brower (Inupiat, Middle names pronounced Qaiyaan Naġiaq in Iñupiaq) is an American academic administrator. She was president of Iḷisaġvik College from 2012-2020.

Early life and education 
Brower was raised in Utqiagvik, Alaska and Northern California by a family of Iñupiat, Armenian, and Chippewa descent. Her Iñupiat grandmother served as an elected member of the North Slope Borough School Board and was an education advocate. Her maternal grandfather was a culture bearer who lived in the Alaska North Slope. 

Brower graduated from Shasta College. She completed two B.A. degrees in Alaska Native Studies and Anthropology in 2004. She completed a master's degree in Alaska Native and Rural Development in 2010 at University of Alaska Fairbanks (UAF). She completed a Ph.D. in 2016 in indigenous studies, with an emphasis in indigenous leadership from UAF.

Career 
Brower managed a culture and education grant for North Slope Borough and was a museum curator at the Iñupiat Heritage Center. She joined Iḷisaġvik College in 2007, where she worked in institutional advancement, student services, and marketing. She served as the director of external relations and development at Iḷisaġvik; she was selected as president of the college in 2012, after having served three months as the interim. In 2015, Brower was named by Alaska Journal of Commerce as one of Alaska's top 40 under 40.

Personal life 
Brower is married to Donald Jesse Darling Jr. They have two daughters.

See also 

 List of women presidents or chancellors of co-ed colleges and universities

References 

Year of birth missing (living people)
Living people
20th-century Native Americans
21st-century Native Americans
Academics from California
American people of Armenian descent
American people of Ojibwe descent
American women academics
Inupiat people
Native American academics
Native American women academics
People from Utqiagvik, Alaska
Place of birth missing (living people)
Presidents of Iḷisaġvik College
University of Alaska Fairbanks alumni
Women heads of universities and colleges
20th-century Native American women
21st-century Native American women